Thomas J. Silhavy is the Warner-Lambert Parke-Davis Professor of molecular biology at Princeton University. Silhavy is a bacterial geneticist who has made fundamental contributions to several different research fields.  He is best known for his work on protein secretion, membrane biogenesis, and signal transduction.  Using Escherichia coli as a model system, his lab was the first to isolate signal sequence mutations, identify a component of cellular protein secretion machinery, discover an integral membrane component of the outer membrane assembly machinery, and to identify and characterize a two-component regulatory system.  Current work in his lab is focused on the mechanisms of outer membrane biogenesis and the regulatory systems that sense and respond to envelope stress and trigger the developmental pathway that allows cells to survive starvation.  He is the author of more than 200 research articles and three books.

Silhavy was elected to the National Academy of Sciences in 2005.

Honors

2016 American Society for Microbiology Lifetime Achievement Award
2011–2021 Editor-in-Chief, Journal of Bacteriology
2008 Genetics Society of America Novitski Prize

2008 Associate Member of the European Molecular Biology Organization (EMBO)
2005 Member of American Academy of Arts and Sciences
2005 Member of the National Academy of Sciences
2002 Graduate Microbiology Teaching Award from American Society for Microbiology

Trainees
 Scott D. Emr
 Michael N. Hall

External links
 Profile of Silhavy

References 

Living people
American molecular biologists
Princeton University faculty
Members of the United States National Academy of Sciences
American microbiologists
Harvard University alumni
1948 births